Lorraine is a town in Mopani District Municipality in the Limpopo province of South Africa.

Another place named "Lorraine" in South Africa, is an old residential suburb of Port Elizabeth.

References

Populated places in the Maruleng Local Municipality